"Abed's Uncontrollable Christmas" is the eleventh episode of the second season of the American comedy television series Community and the thirty-sixth episode overall. It originally aired on NBC on December 9, 2010. In a break from the show's usual live-action format, the episode is a stop motion Christmas-themed episode.

Plot
On the final day of the semester, Abed (Danny Pudi) begins seeing the world in claymation, to the rest of the study group's concern. He meets with Jeff (Joel McHale), Britta (Gillian Jacobs), and Professor Duncan (John Oliver); Duncan seems interested in studying Abed's delusions to benefit his career, but Abed insists he does not need therapy. Despite this, Britta tricks Abed into attending a therapy session with the group led by Duncan. Abed accepts it and leads the group on an imaginary journey to "Planet Abed".

Upon arrival, the rest of the group is transformed into toy versions of themselves. Shirley (Yvette Nicole Brown) and Jeff quickly express disdain for Abed's fantasies, and the two are ejected by a Christmas pterodactyl and eaten by "humbugs", respectively. The others arrive at the Cave of Frozen Memories. There, Duncan seeks to discover Abed's repressed memories but ends up revealing his own distressing memories of Christmas; he exits in humiliation. Abed leaves the cave but stops Britta from joining him due to her earlier deception; Britta tries to explain she was looking out for Abed.

The group boards a train to the North Pole. Abed tells Troy (Donald Glover) and Annie (Alison Brie) about his mother's annual visits on December 9 to watch Rudolph the Red-Nosed Reindeer. Troy tells him it is currently December 9, which Abed denies. Duncan returns with the reason for Abed's delusion, but Annie and Troy restrain Duncan while Abed escapes.

Abed, joined by Pierce (Chevy Chase), reaches Santa's workshop and finds the meaning of Christmas – a DVD set of the first season of Lost, which he says represents lack of payoff. Duncan returns again with a card from Abed's dorm room, which reveals that Abed's mother will not be visiting this year. Upon hearing this, Abed freezes inside a block of ice. Pierce criticizes Duncan's therapy methods; Duncan argues this is what happens when people put too much meaning into Christmas. At this point, the entire group returns to support Abed, attacking Duncan and ejecting him from the fantasy with the Christmas pterodactyl. An unfrozen Abed changes his view, describing the meaning of Christmas as whatever meaning people choose to give it. The group returns to the study room, and they join Abed to watch Rudolph the Red-Nosed Reindeer.

Production
The episode was written by series creator Dan Harmon and Dino Stamatopoulos, who co-founded the production house used for the episode, Starburns Industries. Stamatopoulos portrays a minor character called Star-Burns in the series and is also the creator of the stop-motion animated series Moral Orel and Mary Shelley's Frankenhole. The episode was directed by Duke Johnson. It was made in the style of Rankin/Bass' stop motion Christmas specials, such as Rudolph the Red-Nosed Reindeer and Santa Claus Is Comin' to Town. Dan Harmon stated in an interview with TV Guide that "There's a reason for it to be stop-motion animated, but it's not a dream. It still exists within the reality of the show."

The production of the episode was overseen by owners of 23D Films and also Starburns Industries co-founders, James Fino and Joe Russo II (not to be confused with Joe Russo, a director and executive producer on Community). The animation process was completed in four months, less than half the time it takes to produce an episode of The Simpsons. Fino said animators of the films Coraline and The Nightmare Before Christmas also contributed to the animation. On August 1, 2010, creator Dan Harmon informed Dino Stamatopoulos and Joe Russo that NBC had approved the idea of an animated episode. Two weeks later, Harmon and Stamatopoulos finished the script, and the art department began production on the sets and puppets. Animation began on October 18, though a week later they discovered Pierce was in a wheelchair and had to add a stop-motion wheelchair. One day prior to airing, the completed shots were handed in by 23D Films. Russo said about the project, "We wondered if we could do it. But we knew we'd regret it down the road if we weren't part of this, producing a special episode of a really cool show."

Cultural references
The episode loosely follows the plot of The Polar Express, while serving as an homage to stop motion Christmas specials such as Rudolph the Red-Nosed Reindeer and Santa Claus Is Comin' to Town. When Shirley, Jeff and Britta are ejected from Abed's Christmas wonderland, Abed and Annie each sing a short moralistic song about their transgressions, similar to those sung by the Oompa Loompas in Charlie and the Chocolate Factory. Abed finds the meaning of Christmas in a Christmas gift with the first season of Lost on DVD, saying the metaphor means "lack of payoff", later saying "The meaning of Christmas is the idea that Christmas has meaning. And it can mean whatever we want...Thanks Lost." When Duncan and Troy teleport, they do so by taking a deep breath and holding their nose. This is identical to the method used in the 1970s British children's television series Rentaghost. The characters' animated avatars evoke Rudolph's Shiny New Year (Shirley), The Little Drummer Boy (Troy), and the island of misfit toys from Rudolph (Jeff).

Reception
In its original broadcast on December 9, 2010, "Abed's Uncontrollable Christmas" was viewed by an estimated 4.29 million viewers, with a Nielsen rating of 1.4 in the 18–49 demographic. The overall viewership was adjusted down for NBC due to local NFL broadcasts in Indianapolis and Nashville. The episode tied with the 18–49 rating from the previous episode, "Mixology Certification".

The episode received positive reviews from critics. Emily VanDerWerff of The A.V. Club rated the episode with an A, commenting that "What "Abed's Uncontrollable Christmas" gets that very, very few Christmas specials or episodes have gotten in the history of the medium is the fact that, ultimately, this holiday, more than any other, is intensely personal." TV Squad writer Maggie Furlong called the episode "as touching and poignant as this show has ever been".

Awards

For his work on the episode, character animator Drew Hodges won an Primetime Emmy Award for Outstanding Individual Achievement in Animation at the 63rd Primetime Creative Arts Emmy Awards.

References

External links
"Abed's Uncontrollable Christmas" at NBC.com
 

2010 American television episodes
American Christmas television episodes
Community (season 2) episodes
Stop-motion animated television episodes
Television episodes written by Dan Harmon